Frances Hope Wainwright (born 1921) is an American folk singer who performed with such artists as Pete Seeger, Paul Robeson, and The Weavers (where she was once described as the "fifth" Weaver).

Foye was born in 1921. She performed in Bob Fosse's first musical, Dance Me a Song, in which she premiered the song "Lilac Wine."

Foye suffered under the McCarran Committee and as a result left the United States for a career in Mexico and Europe.

References

1921 births
Living people